Federica Cesarini (born 2 August 1996) is an Italian lightweight rower. She won the gold medal in the lightweight double sculls at 2020 Summer Olympics and in the lightweight quadruple sculls at the 2017 World Rowing Championships.

Biography
Cesarini started the activity in 2009, having her senior debut in 2017. In addition to the international medals won at a senior level, at the youth level she won six more medals. She also won 16 National Championships, 5 of them in the lightweight single scull.

Achievements

References

External links
 

1996 births
Living people
Italian female rowers
World Rowing Championships medalists for Italy
Rowers of Fiamme Oro
Rowers at the 2020 Summer Olympics
Medalists at the 2020 Summer Olympics
Olympic medalists in rowing
Olympic gold medalists for Italy
People from Cittiglio
Sportspeople from the Province of Varese
20th-century Italian women
21st-century Italian women